Vidhi Kasliwal is an Indian film director and producer, who is the founder and CEO of Landmarc Films.

She has worked for Rajshri Productions, where she wrote and produced documentaries, and worked as an assistant to directors Sooraj R. Barjatya and Kaushik Ghatak.

Early life and education
Kasliwal grew up in Mumbai, the eldest of four siblings. She went to Villa Theresa High School. She has a B.Com. from Sydenham College of Commerce and Economics, and went through the Creative Producer's Program at the UCLA Film School.

She plays the santoor and the piano, and she is a trained kathak dancer.

Career
Kasliwal worked as an assistant at Rajshri Productions, and was part of the crew for Vivah (2006) and Ek Vivaah... Aisa Bhi (2008). She wrote and directed Isi Life Mein...!, a film produced by Rajshri Productions, which was released in 2010. 

She has also produced the 2014 Marathi film Sanngto Aika starring Sachin Pilgaonkar, the documentary Block by Block, about the lives of building workers at one of the biggest construction sites in India, and the corporate film Building For The Future about the next generation architecture and engineering in India.

She was the producer and director of the 2018 documentary Vidyoday about a Digambar Jain monk.

The Marathi film Vazandar directed by Sachin Kundalkar, was produced by her own company Landmarc Films. Other projects include Ringan (2017), Gachchi (2017), and Redu (2018)

References

Indian women film producers
Film producers from Mumbai
Indian women filmmakers
Hindi film producers
1981 births
Living people